She Got What She Wanted is an American pre-Code early talking film comedy-drama directed by James Cruze and starring his actress wife Betty Compson. The film was made for Tiffany Pictures with Cruze and Compson having recently completed The Great Gabbo (1929).

Cast
Betty Compson as Mahyna
Lee Tracy as Eddie
Alan Hale as Dave
Gaston Glass as Boris
Dorothy Christy as Olga
Fred Kelsey as Dugan

Preservation status
She Got What She Wanted is now considered a lost film.

See also
List of lost films
Betty Compson filmography

References

External links

She Got What She Wanted at IMDB
allmovie/synopsis;She Got What She Wanted

1930 films
Films directed by James Cruze
Tiffany Pictures films
1930 comedy-drama films
Lost American films
American black-and-white films
American comedy-drama films
Lost comedy-drama films
1930s English-language films
1930s American films